Stolen Pleasures is a lost 1927 American silent drama film, directed by Phil Rosen. It stars Helene Chadwick, Gayne Whitman, and Dorothy Revier, and was released on January 5, 1927. It was produced and released by Columbia Pictures.

Cast
 Helene Chadwick as Doris Manning
 Gayne Whitman as John Manning
 Dorothy Revier as Clara Bradley
 Ray Ripley as Herbert Bradley
 Harland Tucker as Guy Summers

References

External links 
 
 
 
 
  preserved lantern slide(archived)
  lobby card(archived)

1927 drama films
1927 films
American silent feature films
Columbia Pictures films
Films directed by Phil Rosen
American black-and-white films
Silent American drama films
Lost American films
1927 lost films
Lost drama films
1920s American films